Dennis Bailey is a former professional rugby league footballer who played in the 1990s.

External links
Dennis Bailey Statistics at rugbyleagueproject.org
Tetley's Yorkshire County Cup Final 2003
 ĎŔƑ Dewsbury's Last Game, Ever
 ĎŔƑ Memory Lane
Angry Leigh hit out at ref
RUGBY LEAGUE: Henare completes the Lynx
Cougars slump in Rams rampage
Video of try 1:39 -to- 1:59

Dewsbury Rams players
Living people
Year of birth missing (living people)
Place of birth missing (living people)
Rugby league wingers